The Grisly Wife is a 1993 Miles Franklin literary award-winning novel by the Australian author Rodney Hall.

The Miles Franklin Award Judges' Report called it "a novel with a rather surprising vision."

This novel is the third book in The Yandilli Trilogy (also referred to as A Dream More Luminous Than Love), following the novels Captivity Captive in 1988, and The Second Bridgeroom in 1991.

Awards
Miles Franklin Literary Award, 1994: winner 
NBC Banjo Awards, NBC Banjo Award for Fiction, 1994: shortlisted

References

1993 Australian novels
Miles Franklin Award-winning works